Nyctemera hyalina is a moth of the family Erebidae first described by George Thomas Bethune-Baker in 1910. It is found on Sulawesi, Seram, Buru, the Moluccas and in New Guinea.

Subspecies
Nyctemera hyalina hyalina (New Guinea: Arfak Mountains)
Nyctemera hyalina diaphana Roepke, 1949 (Sulawesi)
Nyctemera hyalina stresemanni Rothschild, 1915 (Seram, Buru)

References

Nyctemerina
Moths described in 1910